Cyril Barry Knowles (13 July 1944 – 30 August 1991) was a footballer who played left-back for Tottenham Hotspur and England. He was the son of the rugby league footballer; Cyril Knowles, and the older brother of fellow professional footballer Peter Knowles.

Playing career

Early career 
Knowles was born in Fitzwilliam, West Yorkshire, and started his career as a left winger with local side Hemsworth before rejection from three of the country's leading sides – Manchester United, Blackpool and Wolverhampton Wanderers – left him questioning his future prospects as a professional footballer.

Middlesbrough 
However, Middlesbrough recognised his talents as a potential left-back and Knowles was accepted into their amateur squad. He made his debut late in the 1962–63 season and after just 39 first team appearances legendary Spurs manager Bill Nicholson signed Knowles in 1964 for £45,000.

Tottenham Hotspur 
Knowles was seen as a young replacement for Ron Henry, a member of the Spurs team that famously won the Double in 1960–61, the FA Cup in 1962 and the European Cup Winners Cup in 1963. His first competitive match for Spurs was in a 2–0 win over Sheffield United at White Hart Lane on the opening day of 1964–65 First Division campaign.

Knowles would spend 11 years at White Hart Lane, where he was famed for his crossing ability, creating countless opportunities from open play as well as set pieces. He is also remembered for his excellent partnership with Irish right-back Joe Kinnear and his valuable contribution towards the acceptance of the overlapping, attacking full-back in modern football.

A stalwart of the Spurs first team, he missed only one league match between 1965 and 1969 and represented England four times, making his international debut against the Soviet Union in December 1967. Knowles also represented the English Under-23 team on six occasions and played for Young England against the England senior side and the Football League against the Scottish League in 1968 and 1969. Only the consistent performances of Leeds United star Terry Cooper restricted Knowles to a fringe role in the national team.

Knowles made his final appearance as a professional footballer in a 2–2 draw with Everton in December 1975. Regular knee problems forced his premature retirement at the age of 31 but his contributions and loyalty to Tottenham Hotspur were rewarded with a testimonial match against arch-rivals Arsenal in the same season. An example of his quality was the memorable display against Leeds United in one of his final appearances for the club. With Spurs needing victory to avoid relegation against the reigning First Division champions and 1975 European Cup finalists, Knowles scored twice in a 4–2 victory to keep them in the First Division.

He scored 17 goals in 507 appearances for Tottenham Hotspur, winning the FA Cup in 1967, the League Cup in 1971 and 1973 and a UEFA Cup winners medal in 1972. After announcing his retirement from professional football, Knowles started his managerial career as a Yorkshire based scout for Spurs. This was followed by a brief spell as manager of Hertford Town in 1976 and he was first team coach at Doncaster Rovers between 1977 and 1981.

He was the inspiration for the popular record "Nice One Cyril", performed by Cockerel Chorus, which peaked at number 14 in the UK singles charts in March 1973, and is widely regarded as the greatest left-back in the history of Tottenham Hotspur by both supporters and critics.

Managerial career 
In the summer of 1981, he was appointed assistant manager of Middlesbrough, where he started his career, but resigned two years later to become manager of Fourth Division strugglers Darlington. His second season, 1984–85, was a great success as he transformed the club's playing fortunes and guided them to third place in the Fourth Division, ensuring promotion to the Third Division. Knowles guided Darlington to 13th place in the Third Division for 1985–86, and remains the only manager to have preserved their third-tier status in the modern era.

He resigned as Darlington manager in 1987 following relegation to the Fourth Division, but soon returned to management with Torquay United. As manager of Torquay, Knowles developed the talent of Lee Sharpe, the young winger who would star for Manchester United in the early 1990s and later play for Leeds United and Sampdoria. He transformed a poor side that had almost been relegated from the League the previous season, taking them to the brink of play-offs in his first season and the final of the Associate Members' Cup the following year.

He resigned as manager of Torquay in October 1989 after a disappointing start to the 1989–90 season but returned to management in December, at Fourth Division basement club Hartlepool United. He revived Hartlepool and they finished 12 points clear of relegation. Their form in 1990–91 was even better, and they eventually gained promotion in third place.

He was diagnosed with a brain tumour in February 1991 and coach Alan Murray took temporary charge of the first team. At the end of the season, Murray took over on a permanent basis, with Knowles unable to continue following brain surgery.

Knowles failed to recover from the cancer and he died on 30 August 1991 at the age of 47. Three months after his death a memorial match was played at White Hart Lane and in 1995 a new stand at Hartlepool's Victoria Park stadium was renamed in his honour.

Personal life
Knowles married Betty Grundy in 1967, with whom he had a son, who died in a freak traffic accident when a stone was thrown up from the road and crashed through the window of the car he was in and hit him in the head. Knowles was a Labour Party supporter.

Honours

As a player 
Tottenham Hotspur
 FA Cup: 1967
 FA Charity Shield: 1967 (shared)
 Football League Cup: 1970–71, 1972–73
 Anglo-Italian League Cup: 1971
 UEFA Cup: 1971–72
 UEFA Cup runner-up: 1973–74

As a manager 
Darlington
 Fourth Division third place: 1984–85

Torquay United
 Associate Members' Cup runner-up: 1988–89

Hartlepool United
 Fourth Division third place: 1990-91

Managerial statistics

References

External links

England profile on www.englandstats.com

1944 births
1991 deaths
People from Fitzwilliam, West Yorkshire
English footballers
England international footballers
England under-23 international footballers
UEFA Euro 1968 players
Tottenham Hotspur F.C. players
English football managers
Hertford Town F.C. managers
Darlington F.C. managers
Torquay United F.C. managers
Hartlepool United F.C. managers
English Football League players
English Football League representative players
Association football fullbacks
Footballers from Yorkshire
Middlesbrough F.C. players
UEFA Cup winning players
FA Cup Final players
Deaths from brain cancer in England